Thirty-three amendments to the United States Constitution have been proposed by the United States Congress and sent to the states for ratification since the Constitution was put into operation on March 4, 1789. Twenty-seven of these, having been ratified by the requisite number of states, are part of the Constitution. The first ten amendments were adopted and ratified simultaneously and are known collectively as the Bill of Rights. The 13th, 14th, and 15th amendments are collectively known as the Reconstruction Amendments. Six amendments adopted by Congress and sent to the states have not been ratified by the required number of states. Four of these amendments are still pending, one is closed and has failed by its own terms, and one is closed and has failed by the terms of the resolution proposing it. All 27 ratified and six unratified amendments are listed and detailed in the tables below.

Article Five of the United States Constitution details the two-step process for amending the nation's frame of government. Amendments must be properly proposed and ratified before becoming operative. This process was designed to strike a balance between the excesses of constant change and inflexibility.

An amendment may be proposed and sent to the states for ratification by either:

 The U.S. Congress, whenever a two-thirds majority in both the Senate and the House of Representatives deem it necessary; or
 A national convention, called by Congress for this purpose, on the application of the legislatures of two-thirds of the states (34 since 1959). The convention option has never been used.

To become part of the Constitution, an amendment must be ratified by three-fourths of the states (38 since 1959) by either (as determined by Congress):

 The legislatures of three-fourths of the states; or
 State ratifying conventions in three-fourths of the states. The only amendment to be ratified through the state convention method thus far is the Twenty-first Amendment in 1933. That amendment is also the only one that explicitly repeals an earlier one, the Eighteenth Amendment (ratified in 1919), establishing the prohibition of alcohol.

Then, upon being properly ratified, the archivist issues a certificate proclaiming that an amendment has become an operative part of the Constitution.

Since the early 20th century, Congress has, on several occasions, stipulated that an amendment must be ratified by the required number of states within seven years from the date of its submission to the states in order to become part of the Constitution. Congress's authority to set a ratification deadline was affirmed in 1939 by the United States Supreme Court in Coleman v. Miller.

Approximately 11,770 proposals to amend the Constitution have been introduced in Congress since 1789 (as of January 3, 2019). Collectively, members of the House and Senate typically propose around 200 amendments during each two-year term of Congress. Proposals have covered numerous topics, but none made in recent decades have become part of the Constitution. Historically, most died in the congressional committees to which they were assigned. Since 1999, only about 20 proposed amendments have received a vote by either the full House or Senate. The last time a proposal gained the necessary two-thirds support in both the House and the Senate for submission to the states was the District of Columbia Voting Rights Amendment in 1978. Only 16 states had ratified it when the seven-year time limit expired.

Ratified amendments

Synopsis of each ratified amendment
For the full text of amendments to the United States Constitution, see Additional amendments to the United States Constitution on Wikisource

Summary of ratification data for each ratified amendment

Unratified amendments

Synopsis of each unratified amendment

Summation of ratification data for each unratified amendment

See also
 History of the United States Constitution
 Convention to propose amendments to the United States Constitution

References

External links
 U.S. Constitution, FindLaw.com
 The United States Constitution, USConstitution.net

Amendments to the Constitution